John Frederick Baddeley (July 1854 – Oxford, 16 February 1940) was a British traveller, writer and journalist, best known by his works on Russia and the Caucasus region. He was a Fellow of the Royal Geographical Society, 1902–1940.

He was educated at Wellington College, Berkshire. After visiting Russia for seven months in 1879, Baddeley became the St. Petersburg correspondent for the London Standard, and began a lifelong relationship with that country, travelling widely and writing several important books on its history. In the summer of 1900 he made his first of several journeys to Siberia and the Russian Far East. 

His most outstanding work was Russia, Mongolia, China; being some record of the relations between them from the beginning of the XVIIth century to the death of the Tsar Alexei Mikhailovich, A.D. 1602–1676; rendered mainly in the form of narratives dictated or written by the envoys sent by the Russian tsars, or their voevodas in Siberia, to the Kalmuk and Mongol khans & princes, and to the emperors of China; with introductions, historical and geographical; also a series of maps showing the progress of geographical knowledge in regard to northern Asia during the XVIth, XVIIth & early XVIIIth centuries. The texts taken more especially from manuscripts in the Moscow Foreign Office Archives; the whole by John F. Baddeley; a monumental work, published in 1919 in two volumes as a limited edition of only 250 copies, with an elaborate frontispiece ("the book epitomised in a series of pictures", said Baddeley) drawn by Amédée Forestier and engraved by Emery Walker. It bore a dedication To my friend of many years The Right Honourable Sir William Mather, stating that the production of the book was due to his generosity alone. It earned Baddeley the Victoria Medal of the Royal Geographical Society, and has been later republished as facsimile.

Other Baddeley's works are The Russian Conquest of the Caucasus (1908), Russia in the 'eighties', sport and politics (1921) and The rugged flanks of Caucasus (1940); this posthumous work is dedicated to the geography, topography, history, archaeology, Natural history, and ethnology of the Caucasus, including the oil fields of Baku and some pages on Nadir Shah.

Bibliography
 Baddeley, John F. The Russian conquest of the Caucasus 1720—1860. London, New York, Bombay, Calcutta: Longmans, Green and Co., 1908. Reprinted Mansfield Centre, Conn.: Martino Pub., 2006. .
 Baddeley, John F. Russia, Mongolia, China .... London: Macmillan and Company, 1919. Reprinted Mansfield Centre, Conn.: Martino Pub., 2006. .

See also
 Caucasian War

External links
 The Russian Conquest of the Caucasus online
Across the Caucasus: Photographs and Manuscripts from the John F. Baddeley Collection. 

1854 births
1940 deaths
English male journalists
English male non-fiction writers
Explorers of the Caucasus
Victoria Medal recipients